Honesty or truthfulness is a facet of moral character that connotes positive and virtuous attributes such as integrity, truthfulness, straightforwardness, including straightforwardness of conduct, along with the absence of lying, cheating, theft, etc. Honesty also involves being trustworthy, loyal, fair, and sincere.

Honesty is valued in many ethnic and religious cultures.
"Honesty is the best policy" is a proverb of Edwin Sandys (died 1629), while the quote "Honesty is the first chapter in the book of wisdom" is attributed to Thomas Jefferson, as used in a letter to Nathaniel Macon. April 30 is national Honesty Day in the United States.

William Shakespeare famously described honesty as an attribute people leave behind when he wrote that "no legacy is so rich as honesty" in act 3, scene 5 of "All's Well that Ends Well."

Others have noted, however, that "too much honesty might be seen as undisciplined openness". For example, individuals may be perceived as being "too honest" if they honestly express the negative opinions of others, either without having been asked their opinion, or having been asked in a circumstance where the response would be trivial. This concern manifests in the concept of political correctness, with individuals refraining from expressing their true opinions due to a general societal condemnation of such views. Research has also found that honesty can lead to interpersonal harm because people avoid information about how their honest behavior affects others.

Definitions
Merriam-Webster defines honesty as "fairness and straightforwardness of conduct" or "adherence to the facts".

The Oxford English Dictionary defines honesty as "the quality of being honest." Honest is, in turn, defined as "Free of deceit; truthful and sincere...Morally correct or virtuous...(attributive) Fairly earned, especially through hard work...(of an action) done with good intentions even if unsuccessful or misguided...(attributive) Simple, unpretentious, and unsophisticated.

See also

References

External links

Deception
Virtue
Truth